Ken Yamamura, born , is a Japanese actor best known for playing the younger Ichirō Yashida / Silver Samurai (sharing the main antagonist's role with Haruhiko Yamanouchi) in the 2013 film The Wolverine, and Takashi in the 2014 remake of Godzilla.

Early life
Yamamura was born in Osaka on January 21, 1986. He studied drama at Flinders University in Adelaide, South Australia. After graduating, he has not missed a chance to have a role in a Hollywood blockbuster.

Career
In 2013, Yamamura made his first acting appearance as the younger Ichiro Yashida / Silver Samurai in the American superhero film The Wolverine, which had starred Hugh Jackman. The following year, he went on to portray the role of Takashi, the associate of Bryan Cranston's character, in the 2014 remake of Godzilla.

In 2019, he then appeared to portray as the character Oguchi in the thriller crime drama film Earthquake Bird, featuring Alicia Vikander and Riley Keough, which was released by Netflix on November 15, 2019.

In 2021, Yamamura has portrayed Taka in the film People Just Do Nothing: Big in Japan.

Filmography

Film

Television

 Massan  (2014) – Jiro Fujioka
 Kaze no Tôge: Ginkan no Fu  (2015)
 The Hybrid: Nue no ko  (2015) – Kyogoku

References

External links 

Interview with Tokyo Weekender
Waiting for the "Right" Role and Actor
ShelfWorthy

1986 births
Living people
Japanese male film actors
Japanese male television actors
21st-century Japanese male actors
Male actors from Osaka Prefecture
Flinders University alumni